Manuel Antonio Barrantes Rodríguez is a Costa Rican diplomat and is the current Ambassador of Costa Rica to Russia, presenting his credentials to Russian President Dmitry Medvedev on 29 May 2009.

References

Living people
Ambassadors of Costa Rica to Russia
Year of birth missing (living people)